Cassa di Risparmio di Cento S.p.A. (known as CR Cento or Caricento in short) is an Italian savings bank based in Cento, Emilia-Romagna, which serve the Province of Ferrara, Bologna and Modena.

History
The bank was found on 26 April 1844 in Cento, in the Papal States and open to the public on 27 March 1859. Which the bank still majority owned by the foundation, through direct and indirect ownership (Holding Cassa di Risparmio di Cento S.p.A.). Casse Emiliano Romagnole was a minority shareholder for 20% shares, but sold the shares back to the foundation in 1997.

In October 2017, northern Italy bank Banca Popolare di Sondrio announced that the bank had interested to buy CR Cento, after fellow savings banks of Emilia-Romagna were acquired by BPER Banca and Crédit Agricole Italia in 2017.

Banking foundation
Fondazione Cassa di Risparmio di Cento currently held an equity of €56 million as of 31 December 2013. The foundation sponsored Prize Cento, a prize for literature.

See also

savings bank from the Province of Ferrara
Cassa di Risparmio di Ferrara, a subsidiary of BPER Banca
savings bank from the provincial capital of Emilia-Romagna
Cassa di Risparmio in Bologna, a subsidiary of Intesa Sanpaolo
Cassa di Risparmio di Cesena, a subsidiary of Crédit Agricole Italia
Cassa di Risparmio di Parma e Piacenza, also known as Crédit Agricole Italia, a subsidiary of Crédit Agricole
Cassa di Risparmio di Piacenza e Vigevano
Cassa di Risparmio di Modena, predecessor of UniCredit
Cassa di Risparmio di Ravenna
Cassa di Risparmio di Reggio Emilia, predecessor of Capitalia
Cassa di Risparmio di Rimini (Banca Carim), a subsidiary of Crédit Agricole Italia

References

External links
 
 Fondazione Cassa di Risparmio di Cento 

Banks of Italy
Cento
Companies based in the Province of Ferrara
Banks established in 1859
Italian companies established in 1859